Vahan Artsruni (born December 5, 1965, Yerevan) is a modern Armenian rock musician, singer, composer and artist.

Biography
Artsruni started his musical career in 1984 in the underground minstrel and rock musician Arthur Meschian's band. He graduated at the Yerevan State Medical University and the Yerevan State Musical Conservatory (in 1995) majoring in vocal with the outstanding Armenian singer Gohar Gasparyan. Subsequently, he was soloing with "Narek" Male Choir from 1989 to 1994 and in 1993–1994 at the State Academic Cappella of Armenia and "Haysmavourk" Medieval Choir. He gave concerts with the Armenian National Symphonyc Orchestra, represented "Ethnophonica" and "Komitas. Ten Revelations" cycles. In 2000 Vahan Artsruni organized a progressive music band called ARTSRUNI.

Discography

As Vahan Artsruni
"Prologue." 1991
Rouben Hakhverdyan, Lilit Pipoyan and Vahan Artsruni, 1991
"The Spirit of War." Videofilm,1996
"Idea Fix." Videofilm,1997
"This is our Motherland" 1998 (CD and cassette)
“Armenia” - 2001 (P-CD), Australia
“Ethnophonica” - 2002 (CD), Armenia
“Komitas. Ten revelations” - 2002 (CD), Armenia, USA

As ARTSRUNI band
“Live Cuts” - 2002 (CD), France
“Cruzaid”- 2002 (CD), France
“That’s all LIVE” - 2002 (CD), Armenia

External links
 Official site

1965 births
Living people
Musicians from Yerevan
Yerevan State Medical University alumni
Armenian rock musicians